Crocodeta is a genus of moths in the family Erebidae. The genus was erected by George Hampson in 1914.

Species
Crocodeta erecta Gaede, 1925
Crocodeta variegata (Rothschild, 1913)

References

Nudariina
Moth genera